Dhakti Jui is a village in Uran Taluka, Raigad District in the Indian state of Maharashtra. It is located near Navi Mumbai. It is known for the special type of fishes known locally as Jitada.

Gallery

References 

Villages in Raigad district